The Governor of Odesa Oblast is the head of the executive branch of government for the Odesa Oblast of Ukraine.  The office of Governor is an appointed position, with officeholders being appointed by the President of Ukraine, on recommendation from the Prime Minister, to serve a four-year term.

The official residence for the Governor is located in Odesa.

Governors

Representatives of the President
 Valentyn Symonenko (1992)
 Vladlen Ilyin (1992–1994)
 post eliminated, functions performed by the head of the executive committee ex officio (1994–1995)

Heads of the Administration
 Rouslan Bodelan (1995–1998)
 Serhiy Hrynevetsky (1998–2005)
 Vasyl Tsushko (2005–2006)
 Borys Zvyahintsev (2006) (acting)
 Ivan Plachkov (2006–2007)
 Mykola Serdyuk (2007–2010)
 Eduard Matviychuk (2010–2013)
 Mykola Skoryk (2013–2014)
 Volodymyr Nemyrovsky (2014) 
 Ihor Palytsia (2014–2015)
 Mikheil Saakashvili (2015–2016)
 Solomiia Bobrovska (2016–2017) (acting)
 Maksym Stepanov (2017–2019)
 Serhiy Paraschenko (acting since 6 April to 11 June 2019)
 Svitlana Shatalova (acting since 14 June to 11 October 2019)
 Maksym Kutsyi (2019–2020)
 Vyacheslav Ovechkin (acting from 10 November 2020 to 27 November 2020)
 Serhiy Hrynevetsky (2020–2022)
 Maksym Marchenko (2 March 2022 - 15 March 2023) Marchenko was appointed on the seventh day of the 2022 Russian invasion of Ukraine.

Notes

References

External links
 World Statesmen.org
Government of Odesa Oblast in Ukrainian

 
Odesa Oblast